"Hero" is a song by the American rock band Weezer. It was released on May 6, 2020, as the second single from the band's fifteenth studio album, Van Weezer.

Composition
Rolling Stone described "Hero" as an outcast anthem, which focuses on frontman Rivers Cuomo's feelings of inadequacy. The band described the song as for "the stay at home dreamers, the zoom graduators, the sourdough bakers, and the essential workers". Following the style of Van Weezers return to the band's roots in hard rock, "Hero" has been described musically as an upbeat Weezer song with heavy guitar usage. Spin described it as "a dose of power pop".

On July 30, the band released an alternate version of the song titled "Hero (Piano)", arranged as a piano ballad.

Music video
The music video for the song was directed by Brendan Walter and Jasper Graham. It begins with a scene of Cuomo writing a letter, which is then seen passed along Weezer fans, accompanied with footage of the band performing the song. At the end of the video, the letter is opened to reveal a tribute to essential workers during the COVID-19 pandemic. The video includes a cameo from the band Real Estate.

Charts

Weekly charts

Year-end charts

References

2020 singles
2020 songs
Songs written by Rivers Cuomo
Weezer songs
Impact of the COVID-19 pandemic on the music industry
Atlantic Records singles
Crush Management singles
Song recordings produced by Suzy Shinn